Scopula discrepans is a moth of the family Geometridae. It was described by Prout in 1916. It is endemic to New Guinea.

Subspecies
Scopula discrepans discrepans
Scopula discrepans infirmata Prout, 1938 (New Ireland)

References

Moths described in 1916
discrepans
Endemic fauna of New Guinea
Moths of New Guinea
Taxa named by Louis Beethoven Prout